Farlow is a small village and civil parish in Shropshire, England. The population at the 2011 census was 445.

The chapelry of Farlow was an exclave of Herefordshire, part of the hundred of Wolphy. It is now part of Shropshire, after being transferred by the Counties (Detached Parts) Act 1844.

Nearby is the small town of Cleobury Mortimer. The village of Oreton lies in the parish.

See also
Listed buildings in Farlow, Shropshire

References

External links

Villages in Shropshire
Civil parishes in Shropshire
Places formerly in Herefordshire